The Soul of All Natural Things is the second studio album by American singer Linda Perhacs, released by Asthmatic Kitty Records in 2014. Produced by Chris Price and Fernando Perdomo, the album was released 44 years after her debut album Parallelograms in 1970.

Track listing

Chart positions

References

Linda Perhacs albums
Albums produced by Fernando Perdomo
Asthmatic Kitty albums
2014 albums